Fix the Fells is a conservation programme set up as a partnership between the Lake District National Park, National Trust, Natural England, Lake District Foundation, Friends of the Lake District and Cumbria County Council. Fix the Fells carries out work to combat erosion of footpaths in the English Lake District (a UNESCO World Heritage Site since 2017).

The organisation was established on 18 August 2001, with funding from the Heritage Lottery Fund, in order to protect the landscape and wildlife in the Lake District mountains. In the following 20 years, it has spent almost £10 million on repairing damaged paths and eroded fell landscapes (including numerous Special Areas of Conservation and Sites of Special Scientific Interest). It has also received financial support from the Rural Payments Agency and the European Regional Development Fund. Fix the Fells repairs and maintains 344 upland paths, covering .

From 2001 the repair work was carried out by rangers, from the National Trust and Lake District National Park, working with local contractors. A volunteer scheme was launched in 2007 to assist four teams of rangers and there are now over 100 volunteer ‘lengthsmen’ (a medieval term for someone paid to repair roads and ditches across the length of a parish).

Fix the Fells was featured on the BBC programme “The Lakes with Simon Reeve” on Sunday 21st November 2021.

In 2022, Fix The Fells was the winner of the Park Protector Award from the Campaign for National Parks.

References 

Conservation in England
Lake District
Rural society in the United Kingdom